Ranjitha (born Sri Valli) is an Indian actress. She has acted in a number of Tamil, Malayalam, Telugu and Kannada films.

Career 
In 1991, Ranjita, did her first Telugu film, under the screen name Madhu Bala Kadapa Reddemma. It was written by Parchuri Brothers. She did her second film that year, Prema Panjaram. Both the films didn't do too well commercially, but after that she did the film Nadodi Thendral, directed by Bharathiraja, which provided her a good platform.

Personal life 
She got married in 2000 to an Indian Army Major and retired from acting after her wedding. The couple got divorced in 2002. She made a comeback in 2003, and had acted in supporting roles in films and lead roles in television shows until 2010. 

In 2013, she took up sannyasa under  Swami Nithyananda.

Controversy 
In 2010, Sun TV telecasted a video recordings that claimed to show Ranjitha and Nithyananda in a bedroom. The story became viral among news media in Tamil Nadu. They both claimed the video to be fabricated and accused Sun TV of extortion. A Forensic Sciences Laboratory in Bengaluru confirmed that the video appeared to be that of Nithyananda and Ranjitha. Ranjitha filed a complaint with High Court of Karnataka against news channels. Various news channels were ordered to apologize to Ranjitha for violating the complainant’s privacy and dignity..

Filmography

Tamil

Malayalam

Telugu

Kannada

Hindi

Television
 Chinna Chinna Aasia : Bandham
 Mainakapakshi
 Krishnadasi as Krishnaveni (2000–2002)
 Roja (2003)
Ammayi Kaapuram - Telugu (replaced Raadhika)
 Thekkathi Ponnu as Poun Thaayi  (2008–2009)
 Manikoondu (2008-2010)
 Sigaram
 Singara Chittu

Awards
1996 – Nandi Award for Best Supporting Actress for Maavichiguru

References

External links

Actresses in Malayalam cinema
Indian film actresses
Actresses in Telugu cinema
Actresses in Tamil cinema
Nandi Award winners
Living people
21st-century Indian actresses
Indian television actresses
20th-century Indian actresses
Actresses in Telugu television
Actresses in Kannada cinema
Actresses in Tamil television
1975 births